World Victory Road Presents: Sengoku 5 was a mixed martial arts event promoted by World Victory Road. The event took place on September 28, 2008 at the Yoyogi National Gymnasium in Tokyo, Japan. It featured the start of  World Victory Road's  Middleweight Grand Prix tournament.

Results

See also 
 World Victory Road
 List of Sengoku champions
 2008 in World Victory Road

External links
 Sengoku official website
 Resulta from Sherdog

References

World Victory Road events
2008 in mixed martial arts
Mixed martial arts in Japan
Sports competitions in Tokyo